Anglicisation is a form of cultural assimilation whereby something non-English becomes assimilated into, influenced by or dominated by Englishness or Britishness. It can be socio-cultural, where a non-English person, people or place adopt(s) the English language or English customs; institutional, where institutions are modified to resemble or replaced with the institutions of England or the United Kingdom; or linguistic, where a foreign term or name is altered to become easier to say in English. It can also refer to the influence of English culture and business on other countries outside England or the United Kingdom, including media, cuisine, popular culture, technology, business practices, laws, or political systems.

Anglicisation first occurred in the British Isles, particularly to Celtic populations under the sovereignty of the King of England. Decline of the Celtic languages in England mostly occurred by 1000 AD, but continued up to the 18th century. In Scotland, the decline of Gaelic began under Malcolm III, such that by the mid-14th century, Scots was the dominant national language of Scotland. In Wales, however, the Welsh language has continued to be spoken by a large part of the country's population, though the country still experienced anglicisation through colonisation, institutional reform and industrialisation.

History and examples

Channel Islands 

In the early parts of the 19th century, mostly due to increased immigration from the rest of the British Isles, the town of St Helier became a predominantly English-speaking place, though bilingualism was still common. This created a divided linguistic geography, as the people of the countryside continued to use forms of Norman French, and many did not even know English. English became seen as 'the language of commercial success and moral and intellectual achievement'. The growth of English and the decline of French brought about the adoption of more values and social structures from Victorian England. Eventually, this has led to the Island's culture becoming anglicised and much of the traditional Norman-based culture of the Island being disregarded or lost.

From 1912, the new compulsory education was delivered solely in English, following the cultural norms, and teaching subjects from the perspective, of England.  Anglicisation was supported by the British state. It was suggested that anglicisation would not only encourage loyalty and congeniality between the Islands and Great Britain, but also provide economic prosperity and improved "general happiness". In 1846, through a lens of growing nationalism in the UK, there was concern against sending young islanders to France for education, where they might bring French principles, friendships and views of policy and government to the British Islands. The Jersey gentry adopted this policy of anglicisation, due to the social and economic benefits it would bring. Anglophiles such as John Le Couteur strove to introduce England to Jersey.

British Isles 
Anglicisation was an essential element in the development of British society and of the development of a unified British polity.

Within the British Isles, anglicisation can be defined as the predominantly historical - though still ongoing - expansion of English culture, institutions, norms and even people to Scotland, Wales, the island of Ireland, the Isle of Man and the Channel Islands (i.e. those parts which are not in England). Until the 19th century, most significant period for anglicisation in those regions was the High Medieval Period. Between 1000 and 1300, the British Isles became more England-dominated and -influenced. Firstly, the ruling classes of England, who were of Norman origin after 1066, became anglicised as their separate Norman/French identity, different from the identity of the native masses, became replaced with a single, English identity. Secondly, settler communities in Wales and Ireland promoted their English identities, which became established through colonisation of more Celtic parts of England, Wales and Ireland between approximately 1080 and 1120. Motivated by the desire of political and economic control, this process of English colonisation involved the forced resettlement of existing populations, the establishment of Englishries, and could change the social and ethnic configuration of an area dramatically. However, much of the land the English settled was not intesively used or densely populated. The settling English populations created a world (e.g. farming methods, measurement units, lifestyle, political organisation) in their new settlements in the image of England. While in Scotland, the various ethnic groups were brought under a single umbrella, in Wales and Ireland, the communities were socially and culturally segregated, a distinction which was institutionalised and thus intensified in both countries.

Wales 
According to Colin Williams, Wales might be viewed as the first colony of England. The institutional anglicisation of Wales was finalised with the Laws of Wales Acts, which brought Wales fully into the unitary English state. This not only institutionally anglicised Wales, but brought the anglicisation of Welsh culture and language. The motive for Welsh anglicisation could have been the necessity to secure Protestant England against Catholic incursions and promote the power of the Welsh Tudor dynasty in the rest of England.

Scholars have argued that industrialisation helped to preserve Wales against as thorough anglicisation as Ireland and Scotland, as the Welsh did not have to abandon their language to move abroad for employment. Furthermore, migration patterns created a cultural division of labour, with national migrants tending to work in coalfields or remain in rural villages, while non-national migrants were attracted to coastal towns and cities. This preserved monocultural Welsh communities, allowing for the survival of Welsh language and customs within them. However, other scholars argue that industrialisation and urbanisation made rural Wales suffer decline. Given that the country's large towns and cities were anglicised, this led to an overall anglicisation of the nation.

The education system imposed by the Education Act 1870 and the Welsh Intermediate Education Act 1889 enforced compulsory English-language education on all Welsh children. English "was perceived as the language of progress, equality, prosperity, mass entertainment and pleasure". This and other administrative reforms resulted in the institutional and cultural dominance of English and marginalised of Welsh, especially in the more urban south and north-east.

In 2022, the Commission for Welsh-speaking Communities warned that that migration of English speakers to Welsh-speaking villages and towns was putting the Welsh language at risk.

Linguistic anglicisation 

Linguistic anglicisation is the practice of modifying foreign words, names, and phrases to make them easier to spell, pronounce or understand in English. The term commonly refers to the respelling of foreign words, often to a more drastic degree than that implied in, for example, romanisation.

Non-English words may be anglicised by changing their form and/or pronunciation to something more familiar to English speakers. Some foreign place names are commonly anglicised in English. Examples include the Danish city København (Copenhagen), the Russian city Москва Moskva (Moscow), the Swedish city Göteborg (Gothenburg), the Dutch city Den Haag (The Hague), the Spanish city of Sevilla (Seville), the Egyptian city of القاهرة Al-Qāhira (Cairo), and the Italian city of Firenze (Florence).

In the past, the names of people from other language areas were anglicised to a higher extent than today. This was the general rule for names of Latin or (classical) Greek origin. Today, the anglicised name forms are often retained for the more well-known persons, like Aristotle for Aristoteles, and Adrian (or later Hadrian) for Hadrianus. During the time in which there were large influxes of immigrants from Europe to the United States and United Kingdom during the 19th and 20th centuries, the names of many immigrants were never changed by immigration officials but only by personal choice.

References 

English language
Scots language
Types of words
Word coinage
Transliteration
Cultural assimilation